Saulius Ruškys (born 18 April 1974 in Klaipėda) is a Lithuanian former cyclist.

Major results

1995
 1st Stage 6 Circuit Franco Belge
1998
 1st Paris–Troyes
 1st Sint-Gillis-Waas
 3rd Grand Prix de Beuvry-la-Forêt
1999
 1st  Road race, National Road Championships
 1st Stage 1 Tour de la Somme
 1st Lincoln International GP
 2nd Overall Tour de Normandie
 2nd Grand Prix de Beuvry-la-Forêt
2001
 1st Stage 3 Regio-Tour
 1st Stage 1 Paris–Corrèze
 1st Stage 5 Herald Sun Tour
2002
 1st Stage 2 Three Days of De Panne
2003
 1st Stage 3 Niedersachsen-Rundfahrt
2004
 1st Stage 1 Tour de la Manche
 1st Stage 1 Tour du Limousin
 2nd GP de la Ville de Rennes
2005
 1st Stage 5 Circuit de Lorraine

References

1974 births
Living people
Lithuanian male cyclists
Sportspeople from Klaipėda